The 2022–23 Women's EHF European League is the 42nd edition of EHF's second-tier women's handball competition, running from 8 October 2022 to 14 May 2023. 

SG BBM Bietigheim are the defending champions and play in the EHF Champions League in the current season.

Overview

Team allocation

Round and draw dates
The schedule of the competition will be as follows (all draws are held at the EHF headquarters in Vienna, Austria).

Qualification stage

Round 2
There were 18 teams participating in round 2. 
The first legs were  played on 8–9 October and the second legs were played on 15–16 October 2022.

|}

Round 3
There were 24 teams participating in round 3. The first legs were played on 3–4 December and the second legs were played on 10–11 December 2022.

|}

Group stage

The draw for the group phase was held on Thursday, 15 December 2022. In each group, teams will play against each other in a double round-robin format, with home and away matches.

Group A

Group B

Group C

Group D

Quarterfinals

|}

Matches

Final four

The final four will be held at the Raiffeisen Sportpark in Graz, Austria on 13 and 14 May 2023.

Bracket

See also
 2022–23 Women's EHF Champions League

Notes

References

External links
 Official website

Women's EHF Cup seasons
EHF European League Women
EHF European League Women
Current handball seasons